Defiance was a community in Worth County, Missouri during the late 19th century.

Location
Defiance was located in Union Township on the west bank of the Platte river about 4 miles west of Isadora. It was about one-half mile east of the current location of Sheridan, Missouri.

Early history and name
In 1865, Jacob Winemiller came to the newly formed Worth county, and purchased land in 
township 66, range 33, section 14, on the banks of the Platte river.  After bringing his 
family, he started a sawmill and lumber business. in 1868, John Weaver started a store 
nearby, and by 1872 the town was laid out and a post office established.  Winemiller was the first postmaster.  The town was briefly called Riverside, but the name Defiance was adopted in 1872.

The name comes from the fact that Weaver sold whiskey and defied people to enforce any law 
against him. 
Winemiller and Issac Davis were considered the town founders.

Characteristics
In 1876 an Independent Order of Odd Fellows lodge was started in Defiance. The lodge burned to the ground in 1878, but was rebuilt. By 1882 the town featured 3 blacksmiths, drug and dry goods stores, a shoemaker, carpenter 
and physician. In 1882 the population was reported as 50. The stage coach that operated between Grant City and Hopkins stopped at Defiance.

Decline
In 1887 the Chicago, St. Paul and Kansas City Railroad was built through the Platte Valley, and missed Defiance by a half mile.  
Construction in the new town of Sheridan began in July, and the businesses of Defiance gradually moved west to the new town.

References

Populated places in Worth County, Missouri
Ghost towns in Missouri